Joel Basman (born 23 January  1990) is a Swiss actor.

Early life 
Basman was born in Zurich, Switzerland, to a Swiss Christian mother and an Israeli-Jewish father, both of whom were tailors in the Swiss fashion industry. He grew up in the neighborhood of Aussersihl and was raised bilingual, speaking Swiss-German and Hebrew. He has one older sister who resides in Israel.

Career
In 2004 he started his career and played a bold teenager named Zizou for the weekly soap opera Lüthi und Blanc.

In 2007 director Tobias Ineichen gave the main part to Joel for his film Jimmie. There he played an autistic boy. In February 2008 he got the prize Shooting Star for his part as a Russian teenager on the film Luftibus, written by director Dominque de Rivaz. In September 2008 Joel received the Schweizer Fernsehpreis (Swiss TV-Prize) in the category film. In October 2008 he got the prize for the best main part from Cinema Tous Ecrans.

At the Schauspielhaus Zürich Joel Basman acted 2003 for a youth-theatre project. In 2004 and 2005 he played with students, who were at their final project. He finished his studies at the European Film Actor School in October 2008.

In 2012 Basman got a part as Bertel in the three-piece TV film Unsere Mütter, unsere Väter (Our mothers, our fathers).  He also played Pascal in the Swiss TV-film Ziellos (Aimless).

Joel Basman starred as Sebastien Leclercq in a game called ‘Late Shift’ in 2016.

In 2018, Basman played the lead role in The Awakening of Motti Wolkenbruch, picked up by Netflix.

Filmography

Audio drama 
 2013: Hattie Naylor: Ivan und die Hunde; Regie: Reto Ott (SRF)

Distinctions 
 2008: Schweizer Fernsehpreis
 2008: Shooting Star

References

External links 
 
 
 
 

1990 births
Living people
Male actors from Zürich
Swiss male film actors
Swiss male television actors
Swiss male voice actors
21st-century Swiss male actors
21st-century Israeli male actors
German Film Award winners
Swiss people of Israeli descent
Swiss people of Jewish descent